The Dâmbova is a left tributary of the river Jiu in Romania. It flows into the Jiu near Rovinari.

References

Rivers of Romania
Rivers of Gorj County